No. 18 Squadron (Flying Bullets), is an air-defence unit of the Indian Air Force, flying from Sulur Air Force Station. The squadron is equipped with indigenous  HAL Tejas MK1 in FOC configuration .

The squadron was resurrected on 1 April 2020, at Sulur, Tamil Nadu  following which on 27 May 2020, the FOC variant of Tejas Mk 1 has been inducted into the squadron.

History
The squadron was formed on 15 April 1965, with five Folland Gnats and eleven pilots, it operated out of Srinagar AFS. Although it existed during the Indo-Pakistan War of 1965, it did not officially participate in the conflict. A few pilots from this squadron flew operations with 9 Squadron, and 2 Squadron. Squadron Leader K.L. Khanna, was awarded the Vayu Sena Medal during the war.

The squadron first saw action during the Indo-Pakistan War of 1971, with the task of defending the Kashmir Valley. It operated out of AFS Srinagar, consisting of four aircraft, 17 officers and 72 men commanded by Wing Commander P Raina.  On 4 December, it scrambled to intercept an approaching raid. The raid was never carried out, but the squadron kept flying Combat Air Patrols all day.

It fought its first dogfight, on 6 December, where Flight Lt. Bopaya and Squadron Leader Pathania got on the tail of four Sabres, despite heavy anti-aircraft fire. Bopaya realised that both he and Pathania were tailing the same Sabre, so he broke off and chased another, though he failed to damage any. Pathania managed to damage one of the Sabres, but his gun jammed and he failed to shoot down the plane. The Sabres managed to damage the Srinagar runway, and the pair of fighters were forced to land. On the same day Flight Lt. B.S. Ghuman, and Flying Officer R.V. Padkhe escorted Vampires into Hajira and destroyed a Brigade HQ. Flight Lt. Naliyan and Flying Officer V.K. Sharma flew their squadron's first mission into enemy territory, in the Poonch sector, escorting Vampires on their bombing raids successfully.

On 7 December, Bopaya and Flying Officer Nirmal Jit Singh Sekhon escorted another raid into the Poonch sector, and strafed enemy positions after the Vampires had delivered their weapons. On the 8th, Raina and Ghuman escorted another raid into Kargil, and strafed enemy bunkers after the bombs were delivered.

On 14 December, no patrols had taken place due to poor visibility. On seeing enemy Sabres in the sky, Ghuman and Sekhon were scrambled, without any Air Traffic Controller clearance. The Sabres successfully bombed the runway and turned back. Sekhon chased them and moved out of sight of Ghuman and the ground controllers. One Sabre was seen going out of control in the sky, but while Sekhon chased the second, a third Sabre shot him down. His parachute failed to deploy, and he was killed. He was posthumously awarded the Param Vir Chakra.

After the war, in February 1975, the Gnats were phased out, and replaced by HAL Ajeets. In May 1989, when the squadron was at Hindon, they were replaced with MiG 27s. Its former role of Air Defence was changed to Ground-attack.

The squadron received the Presidential Standard Award in 2015. The squadron was re-formed with the indigenous HAL Tejas on 27 May 2020.

No. 18 Squadron (Flying Bullets), is the only unit in the Indian Air Force to have been awarded the esteemed Param Vir Chakra, the highest gallantry medal awarded during times of war.

Aircraft

Gallery

References

018